Sokolniki  is a village in the administrative district of Gmina Maszewo, within Goleniów County, West Pomeranian Voivodeship, in north-western Poland. It is located within the historic region of Pomerania.

During World War II, the Germans established and operated two forced labour camps for Jewish men and women in the village.

References

Villages in Goleniów County